"My Blue Angel" is a song co-written and recorded by American country music singer Aaron Tippin. It was released in February 1993 as the fourth and final single from the album, Read Between the Lines. The song reached number 7 on the U.S. Billboard Hot Country Singles & Tracks chart and peaked at number 16 on the Canadian RPM Country Tracks chart. It was written by Tippin, Kim Williams, and Philip Douglas.

Music video
The music video was directed by Jon Small and premiered in January 1993. The video features a girl in a romantic relationship with Tippin's character who leaves him for a gangster only for it to be revealed by the gangster that she is an undercover police officer. In the ensuing bust she comes face to face with Tippin again only for him to reveal a detectives badge and the two embrace.

Chart performance
"My Blue Angel" debuted at number 75 on the Hot Country Singles & Tracks chart for the week of January 30, 1993.

References

1993 singles
1992 songs
Aaron Tippin songs
Song recordings produced by Emory Gordy Jr.
Songs written by Aaron Tippin
RCA Records singles
Songs written by Kim Williams (songwriter)